Jicarilla Apache (Jicarilla language: Jicarilla Dindéi), one of several loosely organized autonomous bands of the Eastern Apache, refers to the members of the Jicarilla Apache Nation currently living in New Mexico and speaking a Southern Athabaskan language. The term jicarilla comes from Mexican Spanish meaning "little basket", referring to the small sealed baskets they used as drinking vessels. To neighboring Apache bands, such as the Mescalero and Lipan, they were known as Kinya-Inde ("People who live in fixed houses").

The Jicarilla called themselves also Haisndayin translated as "people who came from below". because they believed themselves to be the sole descendants of the first people to emerge from the underworld, the abode of Ancestral Man and Ancestral Woman, who produced the first people. The Jicarilla believed Hascin, their chief deity, was responsible for the creation of Ancestral Man and Ancestral Woman and also for the creation of the animals and the sun and moon.

The Jicarilla Apache lived in a seminomadic existence in the Sangre de Cristo Mountains and plains of southern Colorado and northern New Mexico, and ranged into the Great Plains starting before 1525 CE. They lived a relatively peaceful life for years, traveling seasonally to traditional hunting, gathering and cultivation along river beds. The Jicarilla learned about farming and pottery from the Puebloan peoples and learned about survival on the plains from the Plains Indians and had a rich and varied diet and lifestyle. The Jicarilla's farming practices expanded to the point where they required considerable time and energy. As a result, the people became rather firmly settled and tended to engage in warfare less frequently than did other Eastern Apache groups. Starting in the 1700s colonial New Spain, pressure from other Native American tribes, such as the Comanches, and later westward expansion of the United States resulted in significant loss of property, expulsion from their sacred lands, and relocation to lands not suited for survival.

The mid-1800s until the mid-1900s were particularly difficult, as tribal bands were displaced, treaties made and broken, subject to significant loss of life due to tuberculosis and other diseases, and lack of opportunities for survival. By 1887, they received their reservation, which was expanded in 1907 to include land more conducive to ranching and agriculture, and within several decades, they realized the rich natural resources of the San Juan Basin under the reservation land.

Tribal members transitioned from a seminomadic lifestyle and are now supported by their oil and gas, casino gaming, forestry, ranching, and tourism industries on the reservation. The Jicarilla continue to be known for their pottery, basketry, and beadwork.

History

Early history
The Jicarilla Apaches are one of the Athabaskan linguistic groups that migrated out of Canada, by 1525 CE, and possibly several hundred or more years earlier, and lived in what they considered their land bounded by four sacred rivers in northern New Mexico and southern Colorado: the Rio Grande, Pecos River, Arkansas River, and Canadian River containing sacred mountain peaks and ranges and ranged out into the plains of northwestern Texas and the western portions of Oklahoma and Kansas. They were found to be in the Chama Valley, New Mexico, and points east by the 1600s. Prior to that time, and the arrival of the Spanish, the Jicarilla lived a relatively peaceful existence.

In the 1600s, the Jicarillas were seminomadic, practicing seasonal agriculture that they learned from the Pueblo people and Spaniards of New Spain along the rivers that flow through their territory.

The Apache are linked to the Dismal River culture of the western Plains, generally attributed to the Paloma and Quartelejo (also Cuartelejo) Apaches. Jicarilla Apache pottery has also been found in some of the Dismal River complex sites. Some of the people of the Dismal River culture joined the Kiowa Apache in the Black Hills of South Dakota. Due to pressure from the Comanche from the west and Pawnee and French from the east, the Kiowa and remaining people of Dismal River culture migrated south, where they later joined the Lipan Apache and Jicarilla Apache nations.

By the 1800s, they were planting along the rivers, especially along the upper Arkansas River and its tributaries, a variety of crops, sometimes using irrigation to aid in growing squash, beans, pumpkins, melons, peas, wheat, and corn. They found farming in the mountains safer than on the open plains. They primarily hunted buffalo into the 17th century, and thereafter hunted antelope, deer, mountain sheep, elk, and buffalo. From the wild, women gathered berries, agave, honey, onions, potatoes, nuts, and seeds.

Sacred land and creation story

They believe the "heart of the world" is located near Taos.

Traditional Jicarilla stories of White Shell Woman, Killer of the Enemies, Child of the Water and others feature places and nearby people special to them, such as the Rio Grande Gorge, Picuris Pueblo, the spring and marsh near El Prado, Hopewell Lake and particularly of the Taos Pueblo and the four sacred rivers. The Jicarilla created shrines in sites that held spiritual meaning, sharing some of the Taos area sites with the Taos Pueblo.

Of the connection to Taos, in 1865 Father Antonio José Martínez, a New Mexican priest, commented that the Jicarilla had a long history living between the mountains and the villages and making pottery as an important source of income. Clay for the pottery came from the Taos and Picuris Pueblo areas.

Pressures for Jicarilla Apache land
Due to increase in other populations, Manifest Destiny, and Indian Wars, the Apaches' traditional cultural and economic lifestyle became strained. Many people died due to famine, Indian Wars, including the Battle of Cieneguilla and diseases not indigenous to the American continent for which they had no resistance.

When the Comanche, who had obtained guns from the French, with their close allies and kin, the Ute, were pushing out onto the plains, they were pillaging the various eastern Apache peoples (Jicarilla, Mescalero and Lipan) occupying the southern plains for control. As they were pushed off the plain, the Jicarilla moved to the mountains and near the pueblos and Spanish missions where they sought alliance with the Puebloan peoples and the Spanish settlers. For instance, in 1724 several Apache bands were annihilated by the Comanches who forced them to "give up half their women and children, and then they burned several villages, killing all but sixty-nine men, two women, and three boys." The Jicarillas were forced to seek a refuge into the eastern Sangre de Cristo Mountains north of the Taos Pueblo in New Mexico. Some chose to move to the Pecos Pueblo in New Mexico or joined the Mescalero and Lipan bands in Texas. In 1779 a combined force of Jicarilla, Ute, Pueblo, and Spanish soldiers defeated the Comanche, who, after another seven years and several more military campaigns, finally sued for peace. Thereafter the Jicarilla were able to reestablish themselves in their old tribal territory in southern Colorado.

Ollero and Llanero bands
The geography of the Jicarilla tribal territory consists of two fundamental environments which helped shape the basic social organization of the Tribe into two bands: the Llaneros, or plains people, and the Olleros, or mountain valley people.

Beginning in the 19th century, after being pushed out of the plains, the Jicarilla split into two bands:
 The Olleros, the mountain people - pottery making clan, a.k.a. Northern Jicarilla, lived west of the Rio Grande along the Chama River of New Mexico and Colorado, settled down as farmers, became potters and lived partly in Pueblo-like villages (6 local groups). They began subsidizing their livelihood through sales of micaceous clay pottery and basketry and learned to farm from their Pueblo neighbors. Ollero is Spanish for "potters". Their autonym, or name for themselves, is Saidindê for "Sand People" or "Mountain People" or "Mountain Dwellers"; The Spanish rendering is Hoyeros meaning "mountain-valley people". The Capote Band of Utes (Kapota, Kahpota), living east of the Great Divide south of the Conejos River and east of the Rio Grande west towards the Sangre de Cristo Mountains, in the San Luis Valley, along the headwaters of the Rio Grande and along the Animas River, centering in the vicinity of today Chama and Tierra Amarilla of Rio Arriba County, joined in an alliance with the Olleros (like the Muache with the Llaneros) against the Southern Plains Tribes like the Comanche and Kiowa (their former allies) and Southern Arapaho and Southern Cheyenne and maintained trade relations to Puebloan peoples
 The Llaneros, the plains people clan, a.k.a. Eastern Jicarilla, lived as nomads in tipis, called kozhan by the Jicarilla, followed and hunted buffalo on the plains east of the Rio Grande centering along the headwaters of the Canadian River. During the winter they lived in the mountains between the Canadian River and the Rio Grande, camped and traded near Picuris Pueblo, New Mexico, Pecos, New Mexico and Taos, New Mexico (8 local groups). Their autonym, or name for themselves, is Gulgahén for "Plains People"; the Spanish picked it up as Llaneros - "Plains Dwellers".

Battle of Cieneguilla
The Battle of Cieneguilla (pronounced sienna-GEE-ya; English: small swamp) was an engagement of a group of Jicarilla Apaches, their Ute allies, and the American 1st Cavalry Regiment on March 30, 1854  near what is now Pilar, New Mexico.

Background
By the mid-1800s tensions between the Spanish, multiple Native American nations and westward expanding United States settlers erupted as all sought and laid claim to land in the southwest. Diseases to which Native Americans had no immunity "decimated" their tribes, creating greater pressure for their lands to be taken from them. As tensions of Native Americans grew and numerous attempts to relocate them from their traditional hunting and gathering land and sacred homelands, the Jicarilla became increasingly hostile in their efforts to protect their lands. The United States military developed a defense system of forts and troops to restrict attacks on westward travelers. Fort Union was established, in part, to provide protection from the Jicarillas. The disruption and "mutual incomprehensions" of one another's culture led to warfare among the Spanish, Native American nations and Americans.

Leo E. Oliva, author of Fort Union and the Frontier Army in the Southwest, notes that: "The three cultural groups in the Southwest had different concepts of family life, personal values, social relations, religion, uses and ownership of land and other property, how best to obtain the provisions of life, and warfare."

Fort Union was established by Colonel Edwin Vose Sumner who ordered Major James Henry Carleton's Company K 1st Dragoons on August 2, 1851 to protect of westward travelers between Missouri and New Mexico Territory on the Santa Fe Trail. New Mexico Territory's Governor William Carr Lane made treaties with the Jicarilla and other Native American tribes of New Mexico to relocate to reservations and peacefully take up agriculture on new lands and in agreed for payments to recompense for loss of access to their hunting, gathering and sacred homeland. The United States government, however, pulled the funding for this agreement, betraying the Native American tribal members. Further complicating the situation, all the crops planted by the tribal members failed and the people continued raiding for survival.

Battle and aftermath

In March 1854 Lobo Blanco, a Jicarilla chief, led a band of 30 warriors to raid the horse herd of a contractor for Fort Union; a detachment of 2nd U.S. Dragoons, led by Lieutenant David Bell, pursued the raiders, engaging a fight on the Canadian River and killing many of them, including the chief, who was repeatedly wounded and finally killed by crushing him under a boulder (March 4).

In late March, Maj. George A. Blake, commanding officer at Burgwin Cantonment, sent a detachment of 1st U.S. Dragoon of 60 men (company I and part of company F) to patrol along the Santa Fe trail, and on March 30, 1854, a combined force of about 250 Apaches and Utes fought the U.S. dragoons, led by Lieutenant John Wynn Davidson, near Pilar, New Mexico, then known as Cieneguilla. The battle lasted for 2, or 4 hours according to surviving soldier James A. Bennett (aka James Bronson). The Jicarilla, led by their principal chief, Francisco Chacon, and Flechas Rayadas, fought with flintlock rifles and arrows, killing 22 and a wounding another 36 of 60 dragoon soldiers, who then retreated to Ranchos de Taos lighter by 22 horses and most of the troops' supplies.

Lieutenant Colonel Philip St. George Cooke of the 2nd Dragoons Regiment at once organized an expedition to pursue the Jicarilla. With the help of 32 Pueblo Indian and Mexican scouts under Captain James H. Quinn, with Kit Carson as the principal guide. After a winter pursuit through the mountains, Cooke caught up with the Jicarilla, whose leader, Flechas Rayadas offered an agreement for peace in exchange for the horses and guns the Jicarilla acquired from the Battle, but the arrangement was not accepted. On April 8, Cooke Chief fought tribal members at their camp in the canyon of Ojo Caliente. Dispersing in small bands, the Jicarilla evaded further pursuit, but many died from the harsh cold weather.

A large unit under Maj. James H. Carleton fought again the Jicarillas near Fisher's Peak, in the Raton Mountains, killing several Jicarillas, and Francisco Chacon replied by trying an ambush against the soldiers with 150 warriors, but the Jicarillas were bypassed: five warriors were killed and six wounded, and seventeen among women and children were scattered and probably died of cold and hunger during the flight. In May, Francisco Chacon sent word to Santa Fe for peace and surrendered at Abiquiu.

Jicarilla reservation

Following westward expansion of the United States and the resulting impacts to their livelihoods, attempts began in the mid-1850s to relocate the Jicarilla Apache, who became increasingly hostile to these pressures. In addition, relations with the Spanish also became hostile when the Spanish captured and sold Apache tribal members into slavery. After years of warfare, broken treaties, relocation and being the only southwestern tribe without a reservation, the two Jicarilla Llanero and Ollero bands united in 1873 and sent a delegation to Washington, D.C. to appeal for a reservation. Eventually United States President Grover Cleveland created the Jicarilla Apache Reservation through a United States executive order signed on February 11, 1887.
	
Although they had finally obtained a reservation, it was spiritually disheartening to realize that they would no longer roam on their traditional holy lands and have access to the sacred places. Once settled, they occupied separate areas of the Reservation. The animosities stemming from this period have persisted into the twentieth century, with the Olleros usually identified as progressives and the Llaneros as conservatives.

The land on the reservation, except that held by non-tribal members, was not suitable for agriculture. As a means of survival, timber from the reservation was sold. Until that time, many people suffered from malnutrition and up to 90% of the tribe members had tuberculosis in 1914; By the 1920s it seemed likely that the Jicarilla Apache nation may become extinct due to trachoma, tuberculosis, and other diseases. After several difficult ranching periods, many of the previous sheep herders relocated to the tribal headquarters in Dulce, New Mexico. The Jicarilla suffered due to lack of economic opportunities for decades.

Oil and gas development began on the reservation after World War II resulting in up to $1 million annually, some of which was set aside for a tribal scholarship fund and to develop the Stone Lake Lodge facility. In 1982, the United States Supreme Court ruled in Merrion v. Jicarilla Apache Tribe,  that the tribe had the authority to impose severance taxes on oil companies that were drilling for oil and natural gas on reservation land.

As a means of repayment for lost tribal lands, the Jicarilla received a settlement in 1971 for $9.15 million. The Jicarilla Apache made a claim for compensation to the U.S. Government when the Indian Claims Commission was created. A two-volume technical report was submitted to the Commission on Spanish and Mexican grants, both unconfirmed and confirmed as part of the case. The tribe was awarded $9,150,000 in the Commission's final judgment of April 20, 1971.

In 2019, the census showed that there were 3,353 people living on the reservation. A site for New Mexico states that there are about "2,755 tribal members, most of whom live in the town of Dulce."

Tribal government

The Jicarilla Apache are a federally recognized tribal entity who in 1937 organized a formal government and adopted a constitution. Traditional tribal leaders were elected as their first tribal council members. In 2000 the tribe officially changed their name to the Jicarilla Apache Nation.

Veronica E. Velarde Tiller, author of Culture and Customs of the Apache Indians writes: "All the powers of the tribal governments reflected the traditional values of the Apache people. The protection, preservation, and conservation of the bounty of 'Mother Earth', and all its inhabitants is sacred value shared by all Indian people, and the Apaches were most eager to have this concept incorporated into their tribal constitution."

An important value of sharing was integrated into the constitution, whereby the Apache Indians declare that the resources of the reservation are "held for the benefit of the entire tribe". Further, all land on the reservation is held by the Jicarilla Apache Reservation, one of only two reservations in the United States where land is not owned by individuals but by the tribal nation as a whole. Tribal members are individuals that are at least 3/8 Jicarilla Apache.

The government is made up of the following branches:
 executive, with a president and vice-president serving four-year terms
 legislative, with eight members serving staggering four-year terms
 judicial, tribal court and appellate court judges assigned by the president.

Its capital is Dulce, which comprises over 95 percent of the reservation's population, near the extreme north end. Most tribal offices are located in Dulce.

Reservation

 Rio Arriba County
 Sandoval County.
from the Colorado border south to Cuba, New Mexico. The reservation sits along U.S. Route 64 and N.M. 537.

The reservation has a land area of 1,364.046 sq mi (3,532.864 km²) and had a population of 2,755 as of the 2000 census.

The southern half of the reservation is open plains and the northern portion resides in the treed Rocky Mountains. Mammals and birds migratory paths cross the reservation seasonally, including mountain lion, black bear, elk, Canada geese and turkey. Rainbow, brown and cutthroat trout are stocked in seven lakes on the reservation, but annual conditions such as low precipitation result in high pH-levels. From 1995 to 2000 the lake levels were severely low due to drought; As a result, most of the fish were killed off during those years. The reservation sits on the San Juan Basin, which is rich in fossil fuels. The basin is the largest producer of oil along the Rocky Mountains and the second largest producer of natural gas in the United States.

Culture
The Jicarilla are traditionally matrilocal and are organized into matrilineal clans. They have incorporated some practices of their Pueblo neighbors into their own traditions. They are renowned for their fine basket making of distinctive diamond, cross or zig-zag designs or representations of deer, horses or other animals. They are known for their beadwork and keeping Apache fiddle-making alive.

As of 2000, about 70% of the tribe practice an organized religion, many of whom are Christians. Jicarilla is spoken by about one half of the tribal members, most by older men and women.

Ceremonial practices consist of:
 Puberty feast, called "keesta" in Jicarilla, is a rite of passage ceremony for girls or young women.

Annual events include:
 Little Beaver Celebration with a pow-wow, rodeo, draft horse pull and a five-mile race mid-July.
 Stone Lake Fiesta with ceremonial dances, rodeo and footraces each September 14 and 15.

Economy
The Jicarilla Apache Nation's economy is based upon mining, forestry, gaming, tourism, retail and agriculture, including:
 Oil and gas wells, owned and operated by the tribe. A 50 MW solar farm is being constructed on tribal lands.
 Timber.
 Cattle and sheep ranching.
 Reservation government employees, which include about 50% of tribal members.
 Dulce business employees.
 Traditional arts, including basketry and pottery.
 Tribe-owned Apache Nugget Casino north of Cuba, New Mexico and the Best Western Jicarilla Inn and Casino in Dulce.
 The tribe also owns and operates radio station KCIE (90.5 FM) in Dulce, NM.

Although the mid twentieth century brought additional economic opportunities, high unemployment and a low standard of living prevails for tribal members. From the Tiller's Guide to Indian Country: Economic Profiles of American Reservations, 2005 edition:

Unemployment rate – 14.2%
Labor force – 1,1051

The Jicarilla people live in houses with a lifestyle similar to other Americans. The cost of food at local grocery stores is higher than found near larger U.S. cities. They have access to all modern conveniences and avail themselves according to their desires and financial ability. High unemployment and poverty level income rates have resulted in high crime rates, greatly contributed by a high incidence of [alcohol] abuse, averaging 1.7% of the United States Native American population and as high as 30% in some rural areas or reservations.

Education
Children attend a public school on the reservation. Until the 1960s few children graduated high school; the Bureau of Indian Affairs educational programs and the Chester A. Faris scholarship programs from oil and gas revenues since the 1960s provide opportunities for higher education. In the 1970s some tribal members obtained graduate degrees. Educational assistance offices were created by Apache tribes in the 1980s to help students navigate their educational career.

Portions of the reservation in Rio Arriba County are zoned to Dulce Independent Schools, Chama Valley Independent Schools, and Jemez Mountain Public Schools. Portions of the reservation in Sandoval County are zoned to Cuba Independent Schools.

Notable people

 Francisco Chacon, 19th century chief, leader of the Jicarilla uprising in 1854
 Flechas Rayadas, 19th century chief, involved in the Jicarilla uprising of 1854
 Lobo Blanco, 19th century chief killed in 1854
 Viola Cordova (born 1937), philosopher
 Tammie Allen (born 1964), potter

See also
 Jicarilla language
 Battle of Cieneguilla
 Dulce Base
 KCIE (FM)
 List of Indian reservations in the United States
 Mescalero
 Morris Edward Opler, ethnographer who wrote about the Jicarilla
 A Gunfight, 1971 film financed by the Jicarilla Apache tribe

Notes

References 

General
 Brooks, Clinton E.; Reeve, Frank D.; Bennett, James A. (1996). Forts and Forays: James A. Bennett, A Dragoon in New Mexico, 1850—1856. University of New Mexico Press. .
 Cassells, E. Steve. (1997). The Archeology of Colorado, Revised Edition. Boulder, Colorado: Johnson Books. .
 Carlisle, Jeffrey D. (May 2001). "Spanish Relations with the Apache Nations east of the Rio Grande". University of North Texas.
 Carter, Harvey Lewis. (1990) "Dear Old Kit": The Historical Christopher Carson, University of Oklahoma Press. .
 Davidson, Homer K. (1974). Black Jack Davidson, A Cavalry Commander on the Western Frontier: The Life of General John W. Davidson. A. H. Clark Co. Page 72. .
 Eiselt, B. Sunday. (2009) The Jicarilla Apaches and the Archaeology of the Taos Region. Between the Mountains – Beyond the Mountains. Papers of the Archaeological Society of New Mexico Vol. 35, Albuquerque.
 Gibbon, Guy E.; Ames, Kenneth M. (1998) Archaeology of Prehistoric Native America: An Encyclopedia. .
 Goddard, Pliny E. (1911). Jicarilla Apache texts. Anthropological papers of the American Museum of Natural History (Vol. 8). New York: The American Museum of Natural History.
 Gorenfeld, Will. (Feb, 2008). "The Battle of Cieneguilla." Wild West magazine.
 Greenwald, Emily. (2002). Reconfiguring the reservation: The Nez Perces, Jicarilla Apache and the Dawes Act. University of New Mexico Press. .
 Griffin-Pierce, Trudy. (2000). Native Peoples of the Southwest. University of New Mexico Press. .
 Hook, Jason; Pegler, Martin. (2001). To Love and Die in the West: the American Indian Wars, 1860-90. Chicago: Fitzroy Dearborn Publishers. .
 Kessel, William B.; Wooster, Robert. (ed.) (2005). Encyclopedia of Native American Wars and Warfare. New York: Facts on File. .
 King, Lesley S. (2011). Frommer's New Mexico Hoboken, NJ: Wiley Publishing. .
 Martin, Craig. (ed.) (2002). Fly Fishing in Northern New Mexico. University of New Mexico Press. .
 Oliva, Leo E. (1993).Fort Union and the Frontier Army in the Southwest: Fort Union, New Mexico Military Operations Before the Civil War. National Park Service Online Books.
 Pritzker, Barry M. (2000). A Native American Encyclopedia: History, Culture, and Peoples. Oxford: Oxford University Press. .
 Rajtar, Steve. (1999) Indian War Sites: A Guidebook to Battlefields, Monuments, and Memorials. Jefferson, North Carolina: McFarland & Company, Inc.
 Velarde Tiller, Veronica E. (2011) Culture and Customs of the Apache Indians. Santa Barbara, CA: Greenwood of ABC-CLIO. .
 Warren, Nancy Hunter; Velarde Tiller, Veronica E. (2006). The Jicarilla Apache: A Portrait. University of New Mexico Press. .

Further reading
 Opler, Morris. (1941). A Jicarilla expedition and scalp dance. (Narrated by Alasco Tisnado).
 Opler, Morris. (1942). Myths and tales of the Jicarilla Apache Indians.
 Opler, Morris. (1947). Mythology and folk belief in the maintenance of Jicarilla Apache tribal endogamy.
 Phone, Wilma; & Torivio, Patricia. (1981). Jicarilla mizaa medaóołkai dáłáéé. Albuquerque: Native American Materials Development Center.
 Phone, Wilhelmina; Olson, Maureen; & Martinez, Matilda. (2007). Dictionary of Jicarilla Apache: Abáachi Mizaa Iłkee' Siijai. Axelrod, Melissa; Gómez de García, Jule; Lachler, Jordan; & Burke, Sean M. (Eds.). UNM Press. .
 Tuttle, Siri G.; & Sandoval, Merton. (2002). Jicarilla Apache. Journal of the International Phonetic Association, 32, 105-112.
 Wilson, Alan, & Vigil Martine, Rita. (1996). Apache (Jicarilla). Guilford, CT: Audio-Forum. . (Includes book and cassette recording).

External links
 Jicarilla Apache Nation website
 Jicarilla Apache Culture (Jicarilla Apache Cultural Affairs Office)
 Jicarilla Apache: Tinde
 Myths of the Jicarilla Apache (University of Virginia Electronic Text Center)
 The Jicarilla Genesis (University of Virginia Electronic Text Center)
 An Apache Medicine Dance (University of Virginia Electronic Text Center)
 Jicarilla Texts (Internet Sacred Text Archive)
 Jicarilla Apache Nation (New Mexico Magazine)
 Jicarilla Apache Nation History  (Apache Nugget Corporation)
  Jicarilla Apache Pottery/Walking Spirit Pottery (Sample of Micaceous Clay Pottery)
  Jicarilla Apache Oil and Gas Administration (Jicarilla Natural Resources)
  Jicarilla Apache Game and Fish (Jicarilla Hunting and Wildlife)

Apache tribes
Federally recognized tribes in the United States
Native American tribes in Colorado
Native American tribes in New Mexico
Northern Rio Grande National Heritage Area